Benjamin Ojwang (1952-2019) was an Anglican bishop in Uganda: he was Bishop of Kitgum from 2002 to 2014.

Ojwang was born in Pader and educated at Uganda Christian University. Ojwang is best known for suing the Church of Uganda.,

References

Anglican bishops of Kitgum
21st-century Anglican bishops in Uganda
2019 deaths
1952 births
People from Pader District
Uganda Christian University alumni